Racing flags are traditionally used in auto racing and similar motorsports to indicate track condition and to communicate important messages to drivers. Typically, the starter, sometimes the grand marshal of a race, waves the flags atop a flag stand near the start/finish line. Track marshals are also stationed at observation posts along the race track in order to communicate both local and course-wide conditions to drivers.  Alternatively, some race tracks employ lights to supplement the primary flag at the start/finish line.

Summary 
While there is no universal system of racing flags across all of motorsports, most series have standardized them, with some flags carrying over between series. For example, the chequered flag is commonly used across all of motorsport to signify the end of a session (practice, qualifying, or race), while the penalty flags differ from series to series. FIA-sanctioned championship flags are the most commonly used internationally (outside of North America) as they cover championships such as Formula 1, the FIA World Endurance Championship and WTCC, and are adopted (and sometimes adapted) by many more motorsport governing bodies across the world such as, for example, the MSA.

Status flags 
Status flags are used to inform all drivers of the general status of the course during a race. In addition, the green, yellow, and red flags described below may be augmented or replaced by lights at various points around the circuit.

Green flag

The solid green flag is usually displayed by the starter to indicate the start of a race. During a race, it is displayed at the end of a caution period or a temporary delay to indicate that the race is restarting. The waving of a green flag is almost universally supplemented with the illumination of green lights (resembling traffic lights) at various intervals around the course, particularly on ovals.

If the race is not under caution or delayed, it is said to be under green-flag conditions. However, the flag itself is typically not continuously waved by the starter. No flag displayed at the starter's stand implies safe, green-flag conditions. At all times, however, the green lights remain lit.

When shown at a marshalling post, a green flag may indicate the end of a local yellow-flag zone.
A separate green flag displayed at the entrance to the pit area indicate that the pits are open.
In NASCAR, a green and yellow flag waved at the same time indicates that the race is being started or restarted under caution and laps are being counted. This is sometimes called a "running yellow" and usually occurs when a track is drying after a rain delay. The officials will utilize the cars in the field to facilitate the final drying of the course, but in order to not waste fuel (affecting fuel strategy, etc.), and delay the race further, the laps are counted towards the advertised race distance. 
In 1980, USAC flagman Duane Sweeney started a tradition at the Indianapolis 500 of waving twin green flags for added visual effect at the start of the race. Green flags waved at restarts were single.
Since roughly the 1990s, some races on occasion invite celebrity guests to wave the green flag at the start of the race. 
Before the use of starting lights in Formula One and most other FIA sanctioned or associated events, the national flag of the country in which a race is occurring, instead of a green flag, was used to signal its start. This practice is retained on occasion in the event of equipment failure, or simply as a tradition, such as at the 24 Hours of Le Mans.
In some series, the green flag is waved at the rear of the grid following the formation lap to indicate to the official controlling the race start that the final car has reached its starting position and the race can be started.

Yellow flag 

The solid yellow flag, or caution flag, universally requires drivers to slow down due to a hazard on the track, typically an accident, a stopped car, debris or light rain. However, the procedures for displaying the yellow flag vary for different racing styles and sanctioning bodies.

In Formula One racing, a yellow flag displayed at the starter's stand or a marshal station indicates that there is a hazard "downstream" of the station. The manner of display depends on the location of the hazard:
A single waved flag denotes a hazard on the racing surface itself.
A single stationary flag denotes a hazard near the racing surface.
Two flags waved simultaneously denotes a hazard that wholly or partly blocks the racing surface (like an accident). This informs the driver that there may be marshals on the track and to prepare to stop, if necessary.

When shown at a station, drivers are forbidden from overtaking until either the hazard or the next flag station displaying a green flag (signifying the end of a cautionary section) is passed. This flag is shown at the discretion of the marshals manning the station.

When the safety car is on the circuit, all flag points will display a "safety car board" (a large white board with "SC" in large black lettering). When flag points are under radio control, this will happen immediately, otherwise, the board is displayed when the safety car comes round for the first time. This is accompanied by a waved yellow flag. Standard yellow flag conditions apply to the whole circuit; notably, overtaking is completely forbidden. When the safety car comes in and the race resumes, a green flag is displayed at the start line, and subsequently at all flag points around the circuit for one lap. Overtaking is not allowed until the cars have passed the start/finish line.

When there are circumstances where double-waved yellow flags are needed yet usage of the safety car is not warranted, then the race will be under a Virtual Safety Car period, during which all flag points will display a "VSC board" and all light panels on track will display the letters "VSC" surrounded by a flashing yellow border. Under the VSC procedure, all drivers on the track must reduce their speed and stay above a minimum time set by race officials at least once in each marshalling sector. Overtaking is not permitted unless another driver enters the pit lane or if a car slows down due to an obvious problem. When deemed safe to end the VSC procedure, teams are notified via the official messaging system 10 to 15 seconds before green flags are waved.

Full-Course Yellow 
Most races in the FIA World Endurance Championship may be under a Full-Course Yellow period upon discretion of the race director when deemed necessary for safety reasons. Overtaking is forbidden until green flags are waved.

The FCY procedure was used during the 2019 24 Hours of Le Mans in response to Porsche's dominant GTE-Pro victory in 2018. Partial track Slow Zones are identified by track-side horizontal markings at both beginning and end, and "Next Slow" boards in the preceding zone. Within the zone, all marshal posts will display double-waved yellow flags and "SLOW" boards, and all light panels will display the letters "SZ" surrounded by a flashing yellow border. All cars within the zone must slow down to 80 km/h until they are clear of the waved green flag at the end.

In Formula E, the FCY condition is used, but unlike any other racing series, the cars have an FCY speed limiter. Overtaking under the FCY condition is not allowed, and could result in a penalty. This happened at the 2019 Rome ePrix, when Jean Eric Vergne overtook future Techeetah teammate António Félix da Costa. As a result, Vergne was given a 5-second time penalty. For the 2019-20 Formula E season, activating attack mode during FCY was disallowed. Additionally, for every 1 minute under FCY, 1kWh of energy gets taken out of their energy allocation.

In both NASCAR and IndyCar, a single yellow flag waved from the starter's stand places the race under caution. At this time, a pace car will enter the course and lead the field at a safe, predetermined, reduced speed. On oval tracks, yellow lights universally supplement the primary flag at the start/finish line. These lights usually operate in a flashing manner, in order to quickly gain the attention of the drivers. The field is locked into place at the onset of caution periods and no one is allowed to pass another car without mutual consent (excluding crashed and immobile cars). In some races, though, cars may pass one another on pit road during a caution period. When the starter shows a furled yellow flag, it indicates one lap to green.

On road course races in IndyCar, a single yellow flag at a marshaling station indicates a "local" yellow, similar to the aforementioned rules in Formula One. In these cases, the pace car does not enter the track, and the caution period is limited only to that particular segment of the track. Green flag racing prevails around the remainder of the course. Twin yellow flags displayed at the starter's stand indicates a "full-course caution," in which the pace car would enter the track and the entire course would be under caution. This might occur for a serious crash or other major hazards. NASCAR has also experimented with "local yellows" on their road course events, although a plain blue flag is used instead.

In the case of snowmobile racing, the yellow flag is displayed at or before the point of the hazard. When a snowmobile racer crosses the yellow flag, the race will continue, however, the skis and track of the snowmobile must remain on the ground.

In snowmobile water cross (racing on open water), the caution flag simply warns the racers that one or more racers have sunk and are in the water, however the race will continue as normal.

In horse racing, the yellow flag means that there is a serious incident ahead, the horses must be pulled up and the race must be declared void. Most yellow flags are seen when a horse has suffered a serious injury.

Code 60 flag
 As an alternative to the full-course yellow and safety car periods used during other FIA-backed races, the 24H Series uses a series of purple lights and flags to declare a "Code 60" period. The race resumes immediately when green flags are waved and green lights are flashing at each marshal post. Yellow flags are still used to indicate local cautions.

Safety concerns and the beneficiary in NASCAR 
The point at which the caution period starts is a topic of controversy in oval racing. Traditionally, the cars were locked into their positions when they crossed the start/finish line, but technological advancements have made it possible to lock them in at the instant that the caution is declared. This has effectively put an end to the "race back to the caution", in which drivers speed up during yellow flag periods to beat the leader to the flag. This practice, while giving lapped drivers a better chance to make their lap back, was at times highly dangerous in that it encouraged drivers to engage in pitched battles with major safety hazards on track. Safety workers were not able to respond to accidents until the cars were under control of the pace car, which markedly slowed their response times to potentially injured drivers. To compensate for the elimination of the race back to the caution, NASCAR and some other motorsports series, both road racing and short oval, have implemented the beneficiary rule, which allows the highest-placed car that is a full lap or more behind the race leader to complete an extra lap during the caution period in order to make up a lap.

In some series (Indy Racing League, Champ Car, beginning in 2007, Formula One, and beginning in mid 2009, NASCAR) lapped cars between the pace car and the leader are allowed to move to the rear of the next lap when the signal is given two laps before a restart.

In Formula One, all lapped cars between the leaders are permitted to advance one lap.

The rule, as enforced in the three open-wheel series, is designed to prevent lapped cars from blocking on ensuing restarts, as to prevent unsportsmanlike blocking when a lapped teammate or friend of one driver attempts to help that driver through impeding the progress of an opponent on the restart.

Red and yellow striped flag 

The red and yellow striped flag or surface flag is displayed stationary at local flag stations to indicate that track conditions have changed due to substances on the track which could reduce grip or cause a car to lose control. Generally oil, coolant, small pieces of debris or sand are the hazards. Many organizations will display this flag for only two laps, after which the changed surface is considered to merely be part of the track. This flag is generally not used anymore, during conditions that would warrant this flag to be waved, the race enters Virtual Safety Car.

Red flag 

The solid red flag is displayed when conditions are too dangerous to continue the session. Depending on the series and the circumstances, the cars are typically directed to proceed immediately to pit road, or to stop at a specific spot on the track. In some severe cases the cars might be required to stop immediately where they are. During red flag conditions, repair work in the pits, the garage area, or on the track is typically prohibited, except in non-points paying races.

There are numerous hazards that might cause a need to halt or prematurely end a session. Many hazards, such as rain, lightning, darkness, a blocked course (due to debris, water, or safety vehicles), a car on fire, or a multi-car crash (especially one that results in serious injuries or one that results in damage to walls, fences or the surface itself which require repairs) might prompt series officials to call for the red flag.

Some series use a red flag to temporarily stop a race nearing the end of a race after an accident or other incident to minimize the number of caution laps, even when the situation would not warrant a red flag at other points in the race. This is usually done when a collision requiring cleanup would otherwise extend the caution period to take longer than the amount of race laps available to finish the race, when a fuel spill occurs on the circuit, or to maximize safety team work. During such a red-flag period, cars are directed to stop in line at a specific point on the track, usually directly opposite to the incident. In Supercars, a race that is suspended after 75% of the laps have been completed may be declared complete at the race director's discretion, such as happened in Supercars forerunner Bathurst 1000 race in 1992 when torrential rain led to numerous cars crashing off the track in laps 144 and 145 and race results were woundback two laps.

The red flag may be used to indicate a pre-determined pause in the race, such as in NASCAR's Budweiser Shootout or the Sprint All Star Race. In these cases, the cars are directed to the pit area where some may be worked on to the extent the race rules allow.

In the event of a bad start, the yellow and red flags may be displayed together, or a unique diagonally divided red and yellow flag can be displayed, to indicate a restart. Drivers will go back to their starting positions and line up for another start. This is rarely used where computer scoring is involved, and can create much confusion as the drivers attempt to get back in order.
In NASCAR, a practice session or a qualifying session is ended with the red and black flags waved together.

White flag

In Formula One, the white flag is waved on the last corner and the pit straight at the end of free practice sessions on Friday and Saturday, indicating to drivers that there are drivers doing practice starts on the pit straight. Drivers are permitted to do one practice start at the end of each free practice session.

In all championships which use the FIA International Sporting Code, as well as North American road racing, the white flag indicates the presence of an officials car such as ambulance, fire truck, jet dryer, etc. or a competitor moving at below normal speed in the section of track covered by the flag station. In IndyCar, a stationary white flag means they are moving above one-third racing speed while waving means they are moving below one-third racing speed.

In most American forms of motorsports – including NASCAR, IndyCar, and North American motorcycle road racing – a waved white flag displayed at the starter's stand indicates the start of the final lap of the race.

In MotoGP, a white flag is used to inform riders that they are allowed to change machine. The Race Direction has deemed that the track is wet enough to justify the change of bikes and the Grand Prix becomes a wet race, having originally been declared a 'dry race' at the start.

In some series, a white flag is shown from all flag stations on the first lap of a practice or qualifying session so competitors will know which stations are staffed.

National flag 
Prior to the adoption of starting lights, the Supercars series and its forerunners would use a green flag to start the race. Following the adoption of lights as the routine starting device, if the starting lights were unavailable a race would started by lowering the national flag of whichever country the race is held in. Typically this would indicate the Australian flag but races in the series are, with the notable exception of 2020 and 2021 COVID-19 pandemic disruptions, regularly held in New Zealand and occasionally are held in other countries such as Bahrain, China and the United States of America. The French flag is used at the start of 24 Hours of Le Mans.

Instruction flags 
Instruction flags are usually used to communicate with one driver at a time.

Black flag 

The solid black flag is used to summon a driver to the pits. It is usually associated with a penalty imposed on the driver for disobeying the rules, but may also be used when a car is suffering a mechanical failure, leaking fluid, exhibiting damage such as loose bodywork, loose hood, dragging bumper, or any other damage that could potentially become a hazard to the driver or other competitors. In some cases, the black flag may be used to call a driver to the pits when their radio is not working, though this is not common.

In FIA International-permitted series, the black flag means an immediate disqualification for the driver involved. The car number of the summoned driver is displayed on the finish line. Some sanctioning bodies wave the black flag at all observation posts simultaneously to order all drivers to clear the track after the starter waves the red flag, often in the case of a serious accident.

In Supercars races, infringements such as exceeding the pit lane speed limit, violating a restart after a safety car period, or causing an accident will result in a drive through pit penalty that must be taken in reasonable time. Rarely, due to the short amount of time in which the driver has to complete the penalty, such a penalty may be rescinded such as in Race 28 of the 2021 season when, upon receiving a penalty for passing before the control line after a safety car period, Shane van Gisbergen protested over his radio that the lead driver had suddenly reduced throttle forcing van Gisbergen to pass, and throttle telemetry supported this. The sudden 42% reduction in throttle itself could have led to a drive through penalty for race leader Anton de Pasquale, but the very wet conditions and possible loss of traction and safety issues were mitigating circumstances.

When the black flag is used for disciplinary reasons in most races in North America, a driver is required to return to pit lane for at minimum a drive-through penalty.  A driver may be black-flagged for failing to maintain a reasonable minimum speed, even if no apparent damage or mechanical failure is present. In almost all cases, the team is given a chance to make repairs to the car and get it up to an acceptable condition. If the driver still cannot maintain minimum speed in relation to the leaders after repairs, the driver may be required to park for the remainder of the race. For example, NASCAR requires that a driver run at or above 115 percent of the fastest lap time by any driver in the final practice. (This can be converted to an average speed-limit based on the length of the course, which for oval tracks will be close to the actual speed limit at any given time.) IndyCar has a 105 percent rule, most notably used when officials parked Jean Alesi and Simona de Silvestro during the 2012 Indianapolis 500.

In the case of snowmobile racing, the black flag comes in three stages to disqualification; the first flag is a warning to a racer, the second flag is a one-lap penalty, and the third is disqualification. In order for a snowmobile racer to receive a black flag, the racer must make contact with intent to inconvenience another racer.

During the Coke Zero Suzuka 8 Hours (FIM World Endurance Championship), a black flag waved from the starter's stand designates the start of the race. In this case, it is not a penalty flag and is a nod solely to the race's sponsor, as Coke Zero utilizes the color black as its visual branding.

Black flag with orange circle 

A mechanical black flag is a black flag with an orange disc in its center which indicates that a vehicle is being summoned to the pits due to serious mechanical problems or loose bodywork that presents a risk to other competitors. At some road racing events, it is used to summon the vehicle to the pits to inform the driver of violation "maximum sound levels.” Also known as the 'Meatball' flag.

Per-bend black/white flag 

A diagonally divided black-and-white flag is displayed with a car number to indicate a warning for unsportsmanlike conduct.  This flag can be displayed if a car tries to intentionally drive another car off the course, or if a driver gets out of their car and initiates an altercation with another driver. The black and white diagonal flag can also mean a warning to a driver for exceeding track limits. For example, Charles Leclerc was shown this flag for "bad sportsmanship" while defending from Lewis Hamilton during the 2019 Italian Grand Prix.

Some administrators (NASCAR and IndyCar) do not distinguish mechanical problems or unsportsmanlike conduct from rules violations and simply use the solid black flag for all violations.

Black flag with white cross

Some leagues use a black flag with a white saltire. This is displayed with a car number if a driver ignores the other black flags for an extended period and also it indicates that that car is no longer being scored. In NASCAR, the car is not scored again until it pays attention to the black flag by pitting once this flag is displayed. However, in IndyCar, they are no longer scored indefinitely (disqualified).

Ignoring the black flag or the black-white cross flag intentionally may result in post-race disciplinary action in addition to disqualification from the race. Fines, probation, suspensions, and other penalties (e.g., points being docked from championship standings) may result, depending upon the severity of the situation.

Blue flag
 

A light blue flag, sometimes with a diagonal yellow, orange, or red stripe, informs a driver that a faster car is approaching and that the driver should move aside to allow one or more faster cars to pass. During a race, this would only be usually shown to a driver who is getting lapped but during practice or qualifying sessions, it could be shown to any driver. In most series, the blue flag is not mandatory—drivers obey it only as a courtesy to their fellow racers. As such, it is often referred to as the "courtesy flag." In other series, drivers get severely penalized for not yielding or for interfering with the leaders, including getting sent to the pits for the rest of the race. In Formula One, if the driver about to be lapped ignores three waved blue flags in a row, he is required to serve a drive-through penalty. The blue flag may also be used to warn a driver that another car on the same lap is going to attempt to overtake them.

The steady blue flag is displayed when a faster car is approaching, the blue flag is waved when the faster car is about to overtake.

Not all racing series use blue flags, for example they are not used in rally or rallycross.

In Formula One, blue lights or flags may be shown at the end of pit lanes to warn of approaching cars on the track.

Chequered flag 

The chequered flag (or checkered flag) is displayed at the start/finish line to indicate that the race is officially finished.  At some circuits, the first flag point will display a repeat chequered flag (usually on the opposite side of the circuit). The flag is commonly associated with the winner of a race, as they are the first driver to "take" (in other words, drive past) the chequered flag.

Upon seeing the chequered flag and crossing the finish line, drivers are required to slow to a safe speed, and return to their garage, parc fermé, or paddock, depending on the applicable regulations of the series.

Design of the chequered flag
There is no standard design for the chequered flag. Although it nearly always consists of alternating black and white squares or rectangles arranged in a chequerboard pattern, the number, size, and length-width proportions of the rectangles vary from one flag to another. Also, the chequered flag typically has a black rectangle at the corner of the flag closest to the top of the flagpole. There have been instances of the black and white squares being painted onto a wooden board and simply held up for drivers to observe at the finish line. Sometimes a sponsor's logo is emblazoned in the center of the chequered flag. In NASCAR and F1 events, a single chequered flag is waved to signal the completion of a race. In IndyCar, two chequered flags are waved together, a tradition dating to the 1980 Indianapolis 500, but only if the race is under green conditions.  (The starter will wave both a chequered and yellow flag if safety car conditions occur at the end of the race, in a yellow-chequer finish.)

NASCAR traditionally has a special version of the chequered flag sewn for Victory Lane that has the name and date of the race on it, a practice that has spread to IndyCar. That flag is used for the team in the winner's photographs taken after the race, and is a prize awarded to the team along with the race trophy. Teams often hang such flags at their headquarters in a similar fashion to other sports teams hanging championship banners from the rafters at stadiums.

Beginning in the 2017 season, NASCAR has utilized a white-and-green variant of the chequered flag to indicate the end of a stage of a race. After the flag is waved, the race temporarily goes into caution to allow drivers who have had placed in the top 10 position following a stage to go into the pit road in a timely manner.

Origins of the chequered flag 

The chequered flag originated in at the Glidden Tours, a road rally, in 1906. Sidney Walden divided the courses into sections; the time check at the end of each section was performed by race officials called "checkers." These checkers used chequered flags to identify themselves. The earliest known photographic record of a chequered flag being used to end a race was from the 1906 Vanderbilt Cup race held in Long Island, New York.

There is a persistent urban legend claiming that the flag originated in horse racing, but there is no basis for this myth. Another myth claims that the chequered flag's earliest known use was for 19th century bicycle races in France, but this claim also has no evidence.

In 1980, USAC starter Duane Sweeney started a tradition at the Indianapolis 500 by waving twin chequered flags at the end of the race. Previous starters had only used a single flag. Sweeney also marked the first use of twin green flags at the start of the race.

There is also plausible evidence that the checkered flag may have in part come from the Scottish Clan MacAulay whom which oversaw the kings Calvary. The clan castle bares the name Ardincaple which translates to roughly “Cape of Horses.” Furthermore the sigil of the clan chief has been adorned by a black and white checkered design and horse spurs since medieval times. This has lead some to believe that due to the strong association of the clan and horses that the banner was adapted. In simple terms that flag was always flown with horses and a logical argument can be made that its usage derived from this connection.

Celebrating a win with the chequered flag 

In snowmobile skipping, the chequered flag is attached to the racer's life vest, and the racer is rewarded with a victory lap.

In many short tracks, the flagman gives the chequered flag to the winner of the race, but a variety of other celebratory traditions, such as the burnout, the Polish victory lap and the victory lane or victory circle celebration, sometimes overshadow the chequered flag tradition.

Use outside auto racing 
The chequered flag has become so well recognized that it is often used to indicate the conclusion of many things unrelated to auto racing. For example, some software installation programs display a chequered flag to indicate that a computer program has been installed successfully. 

Chequered flags were also posted at each corner of the end zones in the original Yankee Stadium when the facility was used by the New York Giants of the National Football League from 1956 through 1973.

The chequered flag is not only used for auto racing, but also for a representation of the automotive industry itself.

Flags in motorcycle racing 

The chequered, red, yellow, white, and green flags are used identically to how they are used in auto racing. The yellow and red striped flag is used to indicate debris on the track. Other flags used include:

 A white flag with couped red cross, to indicate medical attention is required near the marshalling post. Can also mean an ambulance is on the course (generally a red cross is followed by the race being "red flagged")
 A white flag with a saltire red cross indicates precipitation and is used instead of the yellow/red striped slippery surface flag in rain conditions only.
 A black flag with white border, indicating that a rider must leave the course.
 A dark, rather than light blue flag, indicating that a faster motorcycle is approaching.
 A white flag with a black "V", to indicate poor visibility ahead. Used at the Isle of Man TT festival.
A white flag with a black 'SUN', to indicate glare from the sun ahead. Used at the Isle of Man TT festival.

Practicality of racing flags 
Historically, the only means for race officials to communicate to drivers was through the usage of flags. With the advent of two-way or full-duplex radios, this is not necessarily the case. Most drivers racing on paved short track oval courses do not rely on flags; rather, they are informed of track conditions by their crew chiefs and spotters or by yellow / red flashing lights found on most oval tracks. Occasionally, though, some drivers must rely on the use of flags for information when they experience radio malfunctions. Flags are still used to tell the crowd of spectators what is happening. Dirt track and lower-level racers are less likely to have radios than their paved track counterparts.

In contrast to smaller circuits, road racing drivers rely heavily on the use of flags. As it is impractical to have spotters covering all segments of a winding race track, the first indication to drivers of local hazards almost always comes from marshals stationed at various flag stations around the course. Missing or disregarding a flag can have critical consequences, as Mario and Michael Andretti discovered during a 1991 CART race in Detroit, Michigan. Michael came around a blind corner at high speed, without heeding the yellow flag being displayed—and plowed into the back of a CART safety truck tending to another disabled car. Fifteen seconds later, his father Mario disregarded the same madly waving yellows and crashed into the car the safety vehicle was trying to assist.

Modern F1 cars and other high-end formula racing cars have information displays on their steering wheels which can flash up the word flag to warn drivers when they are entering a sector with a local yellow. Most new circuits and older ones used for F1 employ trackside flashing lights at regular intervals, as a clearer way to signal yellow, green, red, blue or SC flag status to drivers than relying on them to spot a marshal waving a flag, especially so on modern circuits where there are large run-off areas which put the marshals well away from the actual track.

References

Further reading 
 Martin, Mark & Tuschak, Beth (2005). NASCAR For Dummies (2nd ed.). Hoboken: Wiley Publishing. .

External links

 Appendix H of the FIA International Sporting Code
 
 Flags used in Formula 1 racing
 Flags in the NASCAR series 
 Definitions of flags used in most forms of motor racing
 ACO Tweaks Le Mans Safety Car Procedure – Sportscar365

Types of flags
Motorsport terminology
Signal flags
Auto racing equipment